Ye Quan (born October 15, 2001) is a Canadian ice dancer who represents South Korea. With his skating partner, Hannah Lim, he is the 2023 World Junior Championships silver medalist, the 2022–23 Junior Grand Prix Final silver medalist, a three-time ISU Junior Grand Prix medalist, and a two-time South Korean Junior champion. They finished in the top six at the 2022 World Junior Championships.

Lim and Quan are the first South Korean ice dancers to win an ISU Grand Prix medal at either the senior or junior level.

Personal  life 
Quan was born on October 15, 2001, in Bolungarvík, Iceland. He moved to China at the age of two and moved again to Montreal, Canada at the age of three. Both of his parents now live in Canada.

Career

Early years 
Quan began learning how to skate at around age five, first training in singles and later switching to ice dance. 

Quan first partnered with Maïka Abgrall-Chouinard and competed at the pre-novice level for two years. He teamed up with Rosalie Groulx in 2017 and competed at the novice level, placing 14th at the 2018 Canadian Championships and 11th at the 2019 Canadian Championships.

In the summer of 2019, Quan partnered with Hannah Lim. They were admitted to the Ice Academy of Montreal, a prestigious training school headed by Canadian coaches Marie-France Dubreuil and Patrice Lauzon and Frenchman Romain Haguenauer. The team competed domestically in Canada for two seasons, before opting to switch to represent South Korea internationally. Lim called the move "a 'thank you' gift" to her parents for their support of her skating career, while Quan said "I was happy to represent South Korea with her."

2021–22 season: International junior debut 
Lim and Quan made their Junior Grand Prix debut for South Korea at the 2021 JGP France I, the first of two Junior Grand Prix events held in Courchevel, France in August. The team placed fourth in the rhythm dance but overtook Czechs Mrázková/Mrázek in the free dance to finish third overall, standing on the podium with American gold medalists Wolfkostin/Chen and their former Canadian domestic rivals Makita/Gunara. Lim and Quan's bronze medal was the first medal for an ice dance team representing South Korea at an ISU Grand Prix series event at either the junior or senior levels. At their second assignment, the 2022 JGP Russia, Lim and Quan placed fifth in the rhythm dance and sixth in the free dance to finish sixth overall. 

The team next competed at the 2022 South Korean Junior Championships in January, where they won the junior national title by a 52-point margin over Kim/Lee. As a result of their placement, they were named to the South Korean team for the 2022 World Junior Championships in Tallinn.

At the World Junior Championships, Lim and Quan were seventh in the rhythm dance but rose to fourth in the free dance to improve their overall standing to sixth place. Their finish matched Kim/Minov's placement in 2014 as the highest finish for a South Korean ice dance team at a World Junior Championships.

2022–23 season 
Lim and Quan opened the Junior Grand Prix series at a Courchevel-held French JGP for the second year in a row. They placed first in both the rhythm dance and the free dance, as well as setting new personal bests in both segments of the competition, to win the gold medal with a new personal best overall. Their win marked the first Junior Grand Prix event title for any South Korean or Asian ice dance team. A month and a half later they competed at their second event, the 2022 JGP Italy in Egna. They finished fourth in the rhythm dance after scoring poorly on their step sequence and part of the Argentine tango pattern dance, but recovered with a second-place free dance and won the silver medal behind Mrázková/Mrázek, the Czech dance team they had beaten for their first JGP medal a year earlier. These results qualified them for the 2022–23 Junior Grand Prix Final, another first for a Korean dance team.

At the Final in Turin, Lim and Quan finished third in the rhythm dance with a score of 64.21. They were only 0.37 points behind Britons Bekker/Hernandez in second place, but also only 0.13 ahead of fourth-place Mrázková/Mrázek, who had been the pre-event favourites before having a double-fall in the segment. In the free dance they rose to second, aided again by a double-fall from the Czechs, who finished 0.99 points behind them overall. Their silver was the first Final medal for a Korean dance team." 

Lim and Quan won their second consecutive South Korean junior title at the 2023 Junior National Championships, again by a wide margin. They were assigned to finish the season at the 2023 World Junior Championships in Calgary, entering as podium favourites. They finished second in the rhythm dance with a new personal best score of 71.08, only 0.11 behind segment leaders Mrázková/Mrázek and more than two points clear of Bekker/Hernandez in third. They set a new personal best in the free dance as well with 103.31, clearing the 100-point threshold for the first time, and won the silver medal. This was the first Junior World medal for a South Korean team. Lim said she was "really glad that we were able to get a first medal for Korea."

Programs

With Lim

Competitive highlights 
JGP: Junior Grand Prix

With Lim for South Korea

With Lim for Canada

With Groulx for Canada

With Abgrall-Chouinard for Canada

Detailed results 
Small medals for short and free programs awarded only at ISU Championships.

Junior level 
With Lim

References

External links 

 

2001 births
Canadian sportspeople of Chinese descent
Living people
South Korean male ice dancers